The Norway women's national floorball team represents Norway in international competitions of women's floorball. They won a bronze medal in the first world championship for women in Mariehamn, Finland in 1997. They also won the bronze medal in Riga, Latvia in 2001.

Medal record

All-time world championship results

World championship results against other teams 

External links 
 Norway at the International Floorball Federation's website
 Norwegian Floorball Federation

Women's national floorball teams
Floorball